The North Dakota secretary of state is an elected office in the U.S. state of North Dakota. The incumbent  was Michael Howe. Duties of the secretary of state include being the custodian of the state's Great Seal and other official state documents, recording the official acts of the governor, distributing copies of legislative resolutions, and recording original bills and resolutions from each biennial Legislative Assembly. Other duties of the office include those pertaining to statewide elections, licensing within the state, and recording trademarks. The secretary of state is second (behind the lieutenant governor) in the line of succession to the office of Governor of North Dakota.

History
From the creation of the office with the state's constitution in 1889, to 2015 there had been 13 Secretaries of State, the least number among any of the state offices created in that year. The Secretary of State originally served a two-year term, but this was extended to four in 1964 by a constitutional amendment.

List of secretaries of state
The following is a list of secretaries of state of North Dakota.

See also
 List of company registers

References

External links
Official website of the North Dakota Secretary of State